In the United States, the forest cover by state and territory is estimated from tree-attributes using the basic statistics reported by the Forest Inventory and Analysis (FIA) program of the Forest Service. Tree volumes and weights are not directly measured in the field, but computed from other variables that can be measured.

This is only the total amount of timberland. Actual forest cover for each state may be significantly higher.

List by state, district, or territory

List by region

See also
Forests of the United States
Forest cover by province or territory in Canada
Forest cover by federal subject in Russia
Forest cover by state or territory in Australia
Forest cover by state in India

References

Notes

Further reading
 US Department of Agriculture. US Forest Resource Facts and HIstorical Trends. 2012. 64 p.

 
Forest
United States, Forest cover
Forestry-related lists